National Highway 301, commonly referred to as NH 301 is a national highway in  India. It is a spur road of National Highway 1. NH-301 traverses the union territory of Ladakh in India.

Route description 
Kargil - Padum(Zanskar) .

Major intersections 

  Terminal near Kargil.

See also 

 List of National Highways in India
 List of National Highways in India by state

References

External links 

 NH 301 on OpenStreetMap

National highways in India
National Highways in Ladakh
Transport in Kargil district
Transport in Kargil